Peter Santenello (born September 27, 1977) is an American videomaker, traveler and entrepreneur who produces videos about travel and human stories.

His content is categorized between travel vlogger and journalist.

Early life and career 
Santenello was born in Burlington, Vermont, and grew up about four hours from New York City in Panton, Vermont, as well as close to Montreal, Quebec around his teen years. He has lived the majority of his adult life on the West Coast. At the age of 25, Santenello traveled around the world for 2 years. He has traveled to 85 countries and lived in 5. Santenello makes content that focuses on human stories on his Youtube and Facebook channels highlighting locations like Ukraine, Iran, Pakistan, Saudi Arabia and the United States. Santenello's first video series took place in the countryside of Ukraine with a family displaced from war. He also does videos about misunderstood or not so widely known cultures like the Hasidic Jews and Amish people and topics like the US border and inner-city America.

References

External links 

1977 births
Living people
American YouTubers